Homewood Plantation was a historic plantation with a mansion of the same name located on it in Natchez, Adams County, Mississippi. Built in 1860 as a wedding present for the Southern belle Catherine Hunt, the daughter of millionaire planter David Hunt, the mansion remained unscathed during the American Civil War of 1861-1865.  By the early twentieth century, it was used as a shooting location for 1915 classic film The Birth of a Nation. The author Stark Young used Homewood as the setting of a wedding  in his 1934  novel  (pages 414 and 415).  The mansion burnt down in 1940.

Location

Homewood was located north of the Natchez, Mississippi city limits on Pine Ridge Road.

History

Homewood was the antebellum plantation home of William S. Balfour and his wife, Catherine Hunt. It adjoined Catherine's sister Charlotte's Lansdowne Plantation. The 600 acre Homewood Plantation was a wedding gift to William and Catherine from Catherine's millionaire, planter father David Hunt. William S. Balfour's father, William L. Balfour of Madison County, Mississippi, was one of the richest Mississippi antebellum planters. He was a founder of the Mississippi College at Clinton. James Buchanan had picked him to run as his vice-president in the 1857 presidential election; however, he died before the election.

William and Catherine's mansion on Homewood Plantation was the suburban Natchez equal of nearby Stanton Hall, which was in the town of Natchez. The mansion, designed by Scottish architect James Hardie, took the five years from 1855 to 1860 to build. While it was being built, William and Catherine lived on his Issaquena County, Mississippi Plantation. This 1,400 acre plantation was known as Fairland and was near the Hunt family's Issaquena County plantations. William had 177 slaves in Issaquena County in 1860. The Balfours moved to Homewood in 1860 with their six children. During the American Civil War of 1861-1865, William served in the Confederate States Army as a Major, and Catherine left by carriage with her children for about one year, moving from place to place. The family returned after the war to find that Homewood was intact. Without the slave labor from before the war, the Balfour's wealth began to decline. Generally, Catherine and her siblings used Cincinnati, Ohio real estate, inherited from her father David, mortgages on their plantations, and whatever else they had to support themselves after the war.

The Balfours sold Homewood to Mr. and Mrs. William J. Kaiser of Natchez in 1907. The Kaisers ran a dairy farm on the plantation. Some scenes from the 1915 film The Birth of a Nation were made on the grounds and porches of Homewood. Beginning in 1932 Homewood became well known, because it was on the annual Natchez Pilgrimage houses tour.

When their children were grown, the Kaisers sold the mansion and 73 acres in 1937 to Mr. and Mrs. Swan of New York, who had visited Homewood on a Pilgrimage tour, for $35,000. Mrs. Swan caused a lot of talk in Natchez. She and her husband, who was much younger, spent huge sums modernizing the mansion and expanding the gardens during the last years of the Great Depression. Their dogs slept on Beautyrest mattresses. The mansion caught fire in 1940. As it was burning to the ground, Mrs. Swan, with a bottle of whiskey in her hand, slowed the firemen's efforts by ordering them off the property. People speculated that the Swans intentionally burned the mansion. The Swans, however, collected $43,000 in damages from five insurance companies as a result of the fire and returned to live in New York. The old antebellum kitchen dependency building, which survived the fire, has been remodeled for use as a residence. The plantation was later sold to William D. Meriwether, Sarah J. Meriwether, and their children. The old carriage house, which also survived the fire, has been a residence and a clubhouse for the Natchez Country Club.

Architecture

The Homewood mansion was about 72 by 96 feet. It had five floors. The basement had several rooms with fireplaces. The first floor had six rooms. The first floor rooms were divided by a center hall and a cross hall that ran just behind the two front rooms. The library, front portion of the center hall, and the parlor could be combined into a 72 foot long ballroom, when the large solid mahogany pocket doors connecting them were opened, that stretched across the front of the house. The second floor had a similar floor plan to the first floor. The attic floor had a large center room surrounded by eight small storage rooms.  From the cupola and the adjoining widow's walk on top of the mansion, the town of Natchez could be seen in the distance.

The mansion had two and one-half foot thick brick walls and thirty-five foot high, metal front porch columns with Ionic capitals. The sidelight windows beside the front door had imported pink glass from Belgium.  Both sides of the mansion had two-story porches with metal lace-work railings.  The imported Cordovan marble fireplace mantles varied in color. The library mantle was pink and grey. The drawing room mantle was white. The dining room mantle was pink with oxblood. Each of the eight bedrooms had different shadings. The interior doors were made of three inch thick mahogany. A curved stairway with fan shaped steps and a black walnut railing was in the rear of the central hall and connected the first, second and attic floors. A spiral staircase rose from the large center room of the attic to the cupola on top.

A two-story kitchen flanked a rear corner of the mansion. The grounds also contained a two-story carriage house made of brick.

References

External links 
 / You Tube video with photos of Homewood
 Map of Natchez at Mississippi Department of Archives and History website shows Homewood Plantation at the top
 American Memory from the Library of Congress website in the Architecture topic has 18 images of Homewood mansion - some of which are floor plans
 Map showing the Balfour family's Issaquena County, Mississippi Plantation in the approximate center

Houses in Natchez, Mississippi
Plantation houses in Mississippi
Plantations in Mississippi
Antebellum architecture
Houses completed in 1860
Burned houses in the United States
Historic American Buildings Survey in Mississippi